German Karlovich Askarov (1882-1937?) was a anarchist from the Russian Empire.

He was born Herman Iakobson into a Jewish family on 24 June 1882, probably in Lodz.

Between 1907 and 1909 he wrote a series of articles for the émigré journal Anarkhist. Here he distinguished between reformist trade unions which he felt were trying to reconcile the forces of labour and capital and the revolutionary syndicats who remained loyal to the goal of overcoming both the state and private property.

He was arrested on 13 January 1935 and charged with anti-Soviet agitation. He was sentenced to five years of imprisonment in correctional labor camps "for counter-revolutionary agitation".

References

1882 births
1937 deaths
Anarcho-communists
Anarchists from the Russian Empire
Russian anarchists
Soviet anarchists